The 2019–20 Euro Hockey Tour was the 24th season of Euro Hockey Tour. It started in November 2019 and lasted until February 2020. It consisted of Karjala Tournament, Channel One Cup and Beijer Hockey Games. The 2020 Carlson Hockey Games were supposed to be part of the tour but were cancelled due to the COVID-19 pandemic.

Final standings

Karjala Tournament

The Karjala Cup was played between 7–10 November 2019. Five of the matches were played in Helsinki, Finland and one match in Leksand, Sweden. The tournament was won by Czech Republic.

Channel One Cup 

The 2019 Channel One Cup was played between 12–15 December 2018. Four matches were played in Moscow, Russia, one match was held in Pilsen, Czech Republic and one match as an outdoor game in Saint Petersburg, Russia. The tournament was won by Sweden.

Beijer Hockey Games

The 2020 Beijer Hockey Games were played between 6–9 February 2020. Five matches were played in Stockholm, Sweden and one match in Helsinki, Finland. The tournament was won by Sweden.

External links
 European Hockey Tour on Eurohockey.com

References 

Euro Hockey Tour
2019–20 in European ice hockey
Ice hockey events curtailed due to the COVID-19 pandemic